Alcocero de Mola is a municipality and town located in the province of Burgos, Castile and León, Spain. According to the 2004 census (INE), the municipality has a population of 53 inhabitants. The town was known only as Alcocero until 1938, when Francoist authorities renamed the village in honour of General Emilio Mola, who died in a plane crash near Alcocero on 3 June 1937.

References 

Municipalities in the Province of Burgos